Tène Youssouf Gueye (1928 in Kaédi – 1988) was a Mauritanian French language poet and historian.

He was President of the Mauritanian Writers Association and became an important civil servant after the independence of his country. He was in prison because of his critical opinions against the Mauritanian government; he died there in 1988.

Works
Les exilés du Goumel, play, 1968
A l'orée du Sahel, stories, 1975
Sahéliennes, poems, 1975
Rella, 1985

References

External links
 CRIDEM-Info

1928 births
1988 deaths
Mauritanian male writers
Mauritanian poets
Mauritanian dramatists and playwrights
Male poets
Male dramatists and playwrights
20th-century poets
20th-century dramatists and playwrights
People from Gorgol Region
Mauritanian historians
20th-century historians
20th-century male writers